Mitten im Leben is a German comedy-reality television series that aired in 2007 starring Heiner Lauterbach and Sandra Speichert.

External links
 

2007 German television series debuts
2007 German television series endings
German comedy television series
German-language television shows
RTL (German TV channel) original programming
Television articles with disputed naming style